A Herschel wedge or Herschel prism is an optical prism used in solar observation to refract most of the light out of the optical path, allowing safe visual observation. It was first proposed and used by astronomer John Herschel in the 1830s.

Overview
The prism in a Herschel wedge has a trapezoidal cross section. The surface of the prism facing the light acts as a standard diagonal mirror, reflecting a small portion of the incoming light at 90 degrees into the eyepiece. The trapezoidal prism shape refracts the remainder of the light gathered by the telescope's objective away at an angle. The Herschel wedge reflects about 4.6% of the light that passes through one of the prism faces that is flat to 1/10 of the wavelength of the light. The remaining ~95.4% of the light and heat goes into the prism and exits through the other face and out the back door of the housing; thus, the excess light and heat is disposed of and not used for observing. While they decrease the intensity of the light, they do not affect the visible spectra, resulting in a more accurate spectral profile, which can be filtered to bring out certain details. They are an alternative to white light filters, which, despite their name, inherently must block certain visible spectra.

Limitations
While the prism is constructed of special glass which absorbs UV and IR light, it cannot be used with a reflecting telescope design. This is because reflecting telescopes usually have a secondary mirror close to focus which may be damaged by the heat caused by IR light. This concentrated IR, in particular, can crack or unglue optical elements in a telescope, especially those located close to the focal plane, resulting in serious injury to the eye or possible blindness. The glass objective lens in a refracting telescope never absorbs these wavelengths (since doing so would make it impossible to image IR/UV wavelengths from dust-clouds and nebula) – indeed, even a normal camera lens will transmit IR, which is why digital camera sensors are fitted with IR blocking filters and why many amateur astronomers go to great lengths to remove these for astro-imaging.

It is also important to note that even at 4.5%, (~N.D. 1.35) the light from the sun is still strong enough to burn the retina, and so an appropriate neutral density filter must still be used.

See also
 List of telescope parts and construction

External links

Astronomical instruments
Astronomical imaging
Solar telescopes
Prisms (optics)